La Campa is a municipality and an aldea, or small town, in the Honduran Department of Lempira, located about  by dirt road from Gracias, the largest town in the immediate region.

The inhabitants of Gracias, La Campa, and other nearby aldeas, including San Manuel Colohete, are mainly of Lenca descent. Although the aldea is small, there are multiple smaller and spread out satellite communities in the hills above La Campa, such as Cruz Alta. These communities grow coffee to consume and sell; substance crops of rice, mango, a dozen varieties of bananas, and black beans; and run their own public elementary schools and churches.

The town is known as a centre of Lenca pottery production, of which there are two main styles; there are black and white (smoked) pots and red-glazed pots. La Campa's are of the latter style. Much of the pottery sold in La Campa is brought down from the hillside villages, where the villagers are adept pottery makers. The town also has a large 18th-century Spanish church. La Campa sits in a deep river valley near Montaña Celaque ( Cerro Las Minas), the tallest mountain in Honduras.

History 

La Campa in 1582 was a small town with 20 tributaries to encomendero Mario Cana.  It was previously known as "Tecauxinas", back in 1887 it was a village of Gracias. It became a municipality in 1921. The name of "La Campa" has its origins in an expression used by old miners, it had to do with searching protection against the rain.

Geography 
It is located on a hillside and it is guarded by a line of solid rock hills covered with pine forests. The weather is cool and temperate most of the year.

Boundaries 
Its boundaries are: 
North : Gracias and Belén municipalities.
South : San Andrés and Santa Cruz.
East  : Belén municipality and Intibuca department.
West  : San Manuel Colohete and San Sebastián municipalities.

Resources 
La Campa is not on a good elevation for coffee plantations. It balances that great flat surfaces proper for sowing vegetables.  An enormous advantage it has consists of numerous fresh water springs, most emanating from within Celaque National Park.

Population 
Half of the people in La Campa have cross-breed traits and the other half are descendants of native Indians. These last are especially seen in the surrounding villages.

In 2001 the population of La Campa municipality was 4,238. The National Intitue of Statistics projected a population increase to reach in excess of 5 thousand inhabitants by 2008.

The La Campa municipality contains 5 designated villages, and 49 other named settlements.

Demographics
At the time of the 2013 Honduras census, La Campa municipality had a population of 6,515. Of these, 80.45% were Indigenous (80.25% Lenca), 18.25% Mestizo, 0.95% Black or Afro-Honduran and 0.35% White.

Tourism 

There are many visits to this place organised by some hotels in Gracias. It is part of "Colosuca" trail and its well preserved church is one of the attractions.
 
"San Matias" day is a local holiday and festival period, running from 15 to 28 February.

References

Municipalities of the Lempira Department